Leonard Charles Dudman (4 August 1933 – 12 February 2004) was a Scottish international cricketer who also represented his country in curling and Junior football.

A right-handed batsman, he made his highest first-class score of 161 against Warwickshire in July 1956.
He was prolific for Perthshire in Scottish domestic cricket, managing 11130 runs.

As a footballer, Dudman was capped once for the Scotland Junior international team in February 1956 whilst playing for Coupar Angus and subsequently stepped up to play for Falkirk and Forfar Athletic.

In later years, he was part of Bill Muirhead's rink from St. Martin's CC in Perth who won the silver medal in the 1976 World Curling Championships.

See also
List of Scottish cricket and football players

References

External links
Cricket Europe
 

1933 births
2004 deaths
Scottish cricketers
Scottish Junior Football Association players
Scottish Football League players
Falkirk F.C. players
Forfar Athletic F.C. players
Scottish male curlers
Coupar Angus F.C. players
Association football inside forwards
Cricketers from Dundee
Scotland junior international footballers
Scottish footballers
Footballers from Dundee